The Zhangjiakou-Hohhot high-speed railway is a high-speed railway located in China. It connects Hohhot, the capital city of Inner Mongolia, to Zhangjiakou in Hebei province. Construction was commenced on April 28, 2014. Connection with the Beijing–Zhangjiakou intercity railway enables high speed rail services from the central region of Inner Mongolia to Beijing, reducing the travel time between Beijing and Hohhot from nine hours to under three hours. The western section from Ulanqab to Hohhot East was opened on August 3, 2017. The section from Zhangjiakou to Ulanqab opened in December 2019.

Stations

Route description
Starting from Zhangjiakou, heading west through Wanquan County and Huai'an County to Huai'an.

References

High-speed railway lines in China